Keith Docker (1 September 1888 – 16 May 1977) was an Australian cricketer. He played two first-class matches for New South Wales in 1919/20.
He was one of four sons of John Frederick Docker, younger brother of Australian cricketer Cyril Docker, and a grandson of English-Australian grazier and politician Joseph Docker.

See also
 List of New South Wales representative cricketers

References

External links
 

1888 births
1977 deaths
Australian cricketers
New South Wales cricketers
Cricketers from Sydney